The Romanian-language surname Morar, literally meaning "miller", is specific to the Moldavia region.

The surname may refer to:

 Daniel Morar, Romanian prosecutor
 Ioan T. Morar, Romanian journalist
 Mihai Morar, Romanian entertainer
 Natalia Morar, Moldovan journalist
 Vasile Morar, Romanian ice hockey player
 Vlad Morar, Romanian football player
 Vincent (Morar), bishop of the Russian Orthodox Church

Occupational surnames
Surnames of Moldovan origin
Romanian-language surnames